Tenacious D is a television  series that ran on HBO from 1997 to 2000. It features the fictional accounts of the real-life comedy rock duo of the same name, which is composed of members Jack Black and Kyle Gass. All of the episodes of the show are available on Tenacious D's The Complete Master Works DVD.

There were three half-hour episodes total in the season, each containing two segments. The show included many songs that would later be re-recorded for the band's studio albums Tenacious D and the Pick of Destiny.

In June 2020, the show was added to HBO Max.

Synopsis 
The series follows the exploits of JB and KG, the two halves of Tenacious D., the self-proclaimed "greatest band on earth." Their music is heavy on power chords and lyrics about sex, Satan, and why they are "the greatest band on Earth."

Episodes are typically bookended by scenes of the band performing at an open mic night, with the events in between often serving as inspiration for a song performed at the end.

Dispute with HBO
According to Gass, HBO offered Tenacious D a deal to make ten episodes, but in doing so, they would have to relinquish their role as executive producers. Gass and Black decided to make a movie instead of giving HBO creative control of Tenacious D, and they made Tenacious D in The Pick of Destiny.

Episodes

References

External links

HBO original programming
Tenacious D
1990s American musical comedy television series
2000s American musical comedy television series
1997 American television series debuts
2000 American television series endings
English-language television shows
Television series based on singers and musicians